Globes is a Hebrew-language daily evening financial newspaper in Israel. Globes was founded in the early 1980s and published in Tel Aviv, Israel. It deals with economic issues and news from the Israeli and international business worlds. The paper is printed on salmon-colored paper, inspired by the British Financial Times.

Globes was one of the first Israeli dailies to publish its contents on the World Wide Web, dating back to April 1995. Its web version publishes in Hebrew and English.

According to TGI 2022 media survey, Globes market share is 4.1% among Israeli financial newspapers. Its main competitors as Israeli financial newspapers in printed media are TheMarker, of the Haaretz group, and Calcalist, published by the Yedioth Ahronoth Group.

History
The daily paper founded by Haim Bar-On, the publisher of the newspaper, on the basis of a small, Haifa-based financial newspaper, in partnership with businessman Eliezer Fishman.

Following the success of Globes, it had a competitor in the form of Telegraph, which had a lower subscription price and was also printed on Saturday. Telegraph was closed after several years. A few years later, the Schocken Media Network published TheMarker economic newspaper as a competitor to Globes.

The chief editor of Globes is Naama Sikuler. Among the regular contributors to the newspaper are Yoav Karni, Tal Schneider, Eli Tsipori, Matti Golan, Naomi Cohen, Stella Korin-Lieber, and Dror Foer.

Globes sections and inserts
Globes is distributed each night Sunday through Thursday, with two major parts:

 Titles – the main news part
 Capital markets – stock exchange supplement

Among the supplements / inserts:

 G – Main weekend supplement, including regular columns by contributors such as Yoav Karni (foreign affairs), Dror Feuer and Roy Yerushalmi (culinary, wine critic, food history & recipes).
 Nadlan – The weekly real-estate insert (Sundays).
 Lady Globes – A monthly magazine insert devoted to women also sold separately on newsstands.

The publishing house is located in Rishon Lezion.

See also
 Calcalist
 TheMarker
 List of newspapers in Israel

References

External links

 Official website (Hebrew)
 Official website (English)

Business newspapers
Daily newspapers published in Israel
Hebrew-language newspapers
Israeli brands
Mass media in Tel Aviv
Evening newspapers